Michael Mac an tSáir  was a bishop in Ireland during the 13th-century.

Mac an tSáir was imposed as Bishop of Clogher  by the Archbishop of Armagh Máel Patraic Ua Scannail,  although the Chapter had elected Reginald MacGilla Finin.  He was consecrated on 9 September 1268  and served until his death in 1285.

References

13th-century Roman Catholic bishops in Ireland
Pre-Reformation bishops of Clogher
1285 deaths